The men's Greco-Roman 78 kilograms (welterweight) Greco-Roman wrestling competition at the 1962 Asian Games in Jakarta was held from 25 to 27 August 1962.

The competition used a form of negative points tournament, with negative points given for any result short of a fall. Accumulation of 6 negative points eliminated the wrestler. When three or fewer wrestlers remained, they advanced to a final round, with only preliminary results amongst them carried forward.

Schedule
All times are Western Indonesian Time (UTC+07:30)

Results

1st round

2nd round

3rd round

4th round

Final standing

References

External links
FILA Database

Greco Roman 78 kg